Mahatma Gandhi Park (also known as MG park) is a public park situated near Kollam Beach in the city of Kollam, Kerala, India. It is about 2 km away from Chinnakada - The city centre of 'Cashew Capital of the World'. It is one of the main centres of recreational activities in Kollam city. The park is owned by Kollam Municipal Corporation and is operated by Rural Tourism Development Company (RUTODEC), a private firm, on contract for a period of five years for maintenance. 'The Quilon Beach' five star hotel(Formerly known as Beach Orchid) is located near to this park.

History
Mahatma Gandhi Park was opened on 1 January 1967  by the then Vice President of India, Zakir Hussein. There was a park complex comprised a deer park and an aquarium then, but closed down due to the troubles from anti-socials. Later in 2010, Kollam Municipal Corporation has allotted money for the renovation of the park and the renovated park was inaugurated by Mrs. Prasanna Earnest, the then Mayor of Kollam, marks the Golden jubilee of MG Beach park at Kollam.

Facilities
 Swimming pool 
 Observatory
 Bowling machine
 Sweet Shops & Cafeteria
 Water Fountains
 Artificial Waterfalls

See also
 Kollam
 Kollam Beach
 Children's Park, Kollam

References

External links 

Tourist attractions in Kollam
Parks in Kollam
1967 establishments in Kerala
Parks established in 1967